Rhodoneura discopis is a moth of the family Thyrididae first described by George Hampson in 1910. It is found in Sri Lanka.

References

Moths of Asia
Moths described in 1910
Thyrididae